Mignonne was an 18-gun Etna-class corvette of the French Navy, launched in 1795. She served until 1803 when the British captured her. Though she served briefly, there is no record of her actually being commissioned into the Royal Navy; she grounded and was condemned in 1804.

French service and capture
Mignonne was built in Cherbourg from 1794 to 1797 and was launched on 15 October 1795. Between 3 and 16 September 1797, she served at Cherbourg under commander Jourdan.

Under Lieutenant Yset, she took part in the Caribbean campaign led by Admiral Louis Thomas Villaret de Joyeuse in 1803. She was involved in the capture of Fort Graville on 6 February, and Camp de Louise on 8 February.

On 28 June 1803, as she sailed with the frigate Poursuivante, she encountered a British convoy off San Domingo, part of the Blockade of Saint-Domingue. One of the escorts, HMS Goliath, was sailing inshore off Cape Nicholas Mole, to try to find two vessels seen earlier. She encountered Mignonne at 10:45, and after a few shots captured her at 11:45. In Captain James Brisbane's words, Mignonne was a "remarkable fast sailing Ship Corvette". She carried sixteen long 18-pounder guns, six of which she had landed. Her crew of only 80 men was under Commander Jean-Pierre Bargeau, and she was two days out of Aux-Cayes, sailing to France via the Cape.

British service
Mignonne was among a number of British prizes that arrived at Jamaica between 2 and 16 July.

The Royal Navy took her into service as the 18-gun ship sloop-of-war HMS Mignonne, but never commissioned her. Her captain was Commander Edward Hawker.

In June 1804 Mignonne ran ashore off Lucca, Jamaica. Desiree was towing her to Port Royal when on 9 July at 0100 hours a bolt of lightning struck Mignonne, killing three seamen, injuring five (or nine), and causing some damage to the ship. Hawker reported that the bolt shattered the topmast and split the mainmast to the keelson.

On 13 October Mignonne captured the French brig St. Antonio y les Animas, which was in ballast.

Fate
In December 1804 Mignonne was laid in the mud at Port Royal, Jamaica. She was then condemned.

Notes, citations, and references

Notes

Citations

References
Gossett, William Patrick (1986) The lost ships of the Royal Navy, 1793-1900. (London: Mansell). 
Harris, Sir William Snow (1843) On the nature of thunderstorms; and on the means of protecting buildings and shipping against ... lightning.
Fonds Marine. Campagnes (opérations; divisions et stations navales; missions diverses). Inventaire de la sous-série Marine BB4. Tome premier: BB210 à 482 (1805-18826) 
 Markham, John (1904) Selections from the correspondence of Admiral John Markham during the years 1801-4 and 1806-7. (Printed for the Navy Records Society [by Spottiswoode]). 
 

Winfield, Rif & Stephen S Roberts (2015) French Warships in the Age of Sail 1786 - 1861: Design Construction, Careers and Fates. (Seaforth Publishing).

External links 
 Naval Database 

Age of Sail corvettes of France
1795 ships
Ships built in France
Captured ships
Etna-class corvettes
Maritime incidents in 1804
Shipwrecks in the Caribbean Sea